KKK may refer to:

Organizations 
 Ku Klux Klan, an American white supremacist group.
 KKK Bosna (or Klizačko Koturaljski Klub Bosna), a skating club from Sarajevo, Bosnia
 Japan Foundation (Japanese: Kokusai Kōryū Kikin), a legal entity to undertake international dissemination of Japanese culture
 Kalmykian Voluntary Cavalry Corps (romanized Russian: Kalmyk Kavallerie Korps), a group of volunteer soldiers during World War II
 Kappa Pi Kappa, a local, social fraternity at Dartmouth College known as Kappa Kappa Kappa for most of its history.
 Tri Kappa, a women's philanthropic organization based in Indiana
 Katipunan (with proper name Kataas-taasang, Kagalang-galangang Katipunan ng̃ mg̃á Anak ng̃ Bayan), a militant society that initiated the Philippine Revolution of 1896
 Katipunan ng Kamalayang Kayumanggi, Philippine political party
 Kapayapaan, Kaunlaran at Katarungan (Peace, Prosperity and Justice), Philippine political party associated with Alfredo Lim
 Koma Komalen Kurdistan (Peoples' Confederation of Kurdistan or Democratic Confederation of Kurdistan)
 Communist Party of Cyprus, known for a time by its Greek initials (kappa, kappa, kappa) for Κομμουνιστικού Κόμματος Κύπρου 
 Krümmel Nuclear Power Plant (German: Kernkraftwerk Krümmel), a nuclear power plant in Germany 
 Turkish Army Land Forces Command (Turkish: Kara Kuvvetleri Komutanlığı), a division of the Turkish Armed Forces

Companies 
 KKK, the Turkish airline AtlasGlobal (ICAO code)
 AG Kühnle, Kopp & Kausch, a former turbine manufacturer from Germany, now a part of Colfax Corporation
 K Market or KK Market or KKK Supermarket or KKKK Citymarket, former naming for markets in the chain of Kesko in Finland; the number of Ks denoted the size class of the market

Other 
 Kimantha, Kenzie and Kaitlin of the U.S. TV series Suburgatory
 Kajiri Kamui Kagura, a Japanese visual novel game
 "K-K-K-Katy", a song written in 1917
 K.K.Kity, a Johnny's Jr. group; here, 'KKK' can also mean "Koyama, Kato and Kusano"
 Kareena Kapoor Khan, an Indian actress
 Kinder, Küche, Kirche, German expression about a family model considered to be traditional
 Konstanta Komitato de l‘ Kongresoj, international committee to organize the World Esperanto Congresses, 1906 to 1933
 KKK, IATA airport code for (now disused) Kalakaket Creek Air Station
KKK, the production code for the 1972 Doctor Who serial Day of the Daleks
 Khandar Khan Khel, location in Khyber Pass, Pakistan
 Kurorty Krasnodarskogo Kraya (Курорты Краснодарского Края), holiday resorts in the Krasnodar Krai territory of southern Russia

Distinguish from
 Kukulkan, a Mayan (Central American) god

See also
 Alternative political spellings using "KKK"